Vela Luka is a small town and a municipality in Dubrovnik-Neretva County in southern Dalmatia, Croatia. The town is located on the western side of the island of Korčula at the bottom of a wide bay which has many indented coves. Vela Luka developed at the beginning of the 19th century in a deep sheltered bay. Its name means "big harbour" in Croatian chakavian. Inhabitants of the Island of Korčula and Pelješac often refer to it simply as "Luka" (the port/harbour). It has several hotels and a medical centre called Kalos (for rheumatic disorders and rehabilitation). The inhabitants are farmers, fishermen and workers in tourism. The town also has small industrial plants.

Population
In 2011, the total population of Vela Luka (not including Potirna where 22 people are living, mostly from Vela Luka) was 4,137. Croats make up an absolute majority with 97% of the population.

Culture, locations and events
Vela Luka has an average of over 2500 hours of sunny weather annually, and is the second largest place, in size, on the Adriatic islands. The diversity and richness of the cultural inheritance of Vela Luka can be seen in the exceptional museums and galleries that are located in the Center for Culture   in the town center. The Center for Culture is located in the building that was constructed for school needs in the second half of the 19th century, so the building itself has historical significance. It is located near the Parish Church of St. Joseph. Together they create a magnificent urban structure in the typical Mediterranean spirit.

The museum/gallery is decorated with mosaics made in 1968 when the International Artist's Meeting of Painters was held in Vela Luka.

Vela Luka has many archaeological and architectural points of interest. On the south slope of the hill, Pinski Rat, there is an extraordinary archaeological site. It is called Vela Spila (Big Cave)  and it is one of the most important prehistoric cave dwellings in Europe. Vela Spila  provides a picture of life on the Mediterranean of Mesolithic and Neolithic people living in that region. Carbon dating has shown that there was human activity going back 20 000 years. The finds are on display at the Center for Culture in Vela Luka. The cave's interior measures approximately 1500 sq. meters and it is located several hundred meters above the beautiful Vela Luka Bay. Another panoramic view of the area can be seen from Hum Hill and the Forteca, an Austro-Hungarian fortress built in the 19th century. Vela Luka has a rich history of Klapa singing (an a cappella style). One of the best known is the Klapa Ošjak.

The following is on display in the museum and the gallery:

 The Archaeological Collection of finds from the historical locality of the Big Cave and antique finds (ceramic dishes, animal & human bones, antique amphora)
 The International Art Collection of drawings, graphic arts, and smaller statues from local artists (Edo Murtić, Picelj, Ujevic) and foreign artists (Soto, Hayer, Messagier),
 Two sculptures by Henry Moore,
 A Collection of ship models by Nedo Gugić,
 The Ethnographic Collection of objects from the El Shatt Refugee Camp;
 Folk costumes from Vela Luka.

The island of Korčula is known for its numerous chivalrous dance tournament unions . The tournaments are performed on many occasions and some incorporate the use of swords. On March 19, 2001 the feast of St. Joseph was celebrated as the day of the community of Vela Luka. This was exactly 75 years after the first celebration of the tournament “Kumpanija”. Thanks to the members of the town's council, the hardworking and persisting practise of about twenty young men of Vela Luka, the tradition continues today. The FD “Kumpanija” is a celebrated as the day of the community for Vela Luka. Saint Joseph is the patron Saint of the town.

Vela Luka's chivalrous dance tournaments festival activity:
 On July 4 there is the international festival of chivalrous dance tournaments in Korcula,
 On September 2 on Sunday there are events in Dubrovnik,
 Chivalrous festival tournament in Madrid-Spain (organize by Consulate of Croatia & town council of Alicante).

Notable people from Vela Luka

 Oliver Dragojević (1947–2018), singer who sang the song "Sjećanje na Vela Luku" (Croatian for 'Remembering Vela Luka').
 Ivo Gugić (1920–1996), Roman Catholic prelate
 Izidor Perera-Matić (1912–1944), physician
 Perica Vlašić (1932–2004), rower
 Jasna Zlokić (born 1955), singer
 Domenica Žuvela (born 1992), singer

References

External links 

 Municipality of Vela Luka
 Tourist Board of the Vela Luka Municipality
 Parish Church of Saint Joseph Vela Luka
 A Stratified Prehistoric Site VELA SPILA (island Korcula)
 Radio M 90,1 MHz Vela Luka
 Czech Vela Luka magazine 

Korčula
Populated coastal places in Croatia
Populated places in Dubrovnik-Neretva County
Municipalities of Croatia